Omega was a Hungarian rock band formed in 1962, which has been described as the most successful such band in history. They have released more than 20 albums both in Hungarian and English. After several early personnel changes, their classic lineup came together in 1971 and was intact for more than forty years. Singer János Kóbor was with the band continuously from 1962 until his death in 2021; keyboardist/singer László Benkő was present from 1962 until his death in 2020. Guitarist György Molnár and bassist Tamás Mihály joined in 1967, and drummer Ferenc Debreczeni joined in 1971. Omega won several prestigious awards for their contributions to Hungarian culture.

History 
Omega was formed in Budapest in 1962 by Benkő and Kóbor, with trombonist Győző Bánkúti, drummer Tamás Künsztler, saxophonist Péter Láng, guitarist Ferenc Tornóczky, and bassist István Varsányi. The members had all been in previous bands at the same grammar school. Their first concert was at Budapest's University of Technology and Economics in September 1962. The band went through many personnel changes in its first several years, and mostly played covers of British rock songs.

Omega first began to write their own songs with the arrival in 1967 of keyboardist/singer Gábor Presser, who was adept in rock, jazz, and folk songwriting. Guitarist György Molnár and bassist/singer Tamás Mihály also joined in 1967. The following year, the band was invited to tour England, where they recorded their debut album Omega: Red Star from Hungary with English lyrics for Decca Records. Later that year, the album was re-recorded in Hungarian and released in the band's home country as Trombitás Frédi és a Rettenetes Emberek (Trumpeter Freddy and the Terrible People). The band's sound during this period included experiments in psychedelic rock. Their 1969 song "Gyöngyhajú lány" ("Pearls In Her Hair") was an international hit, and was later covered by the Scorpions (as "White Dove"). During this period, members of Omega also gained notice for backing several Hungarian pop singers, most notably Sarolta Zalatnay.

In 1971, Gábor Presser and drummer József Laux (who had joined in 1964) left Omega and formed the progressive rock band Locomotiv GT. (Tamás Somló, who had played saxophone for Omega from 1964 to 1968, became bassist for Locomotiv GT in 1973,) Presser was not replaced, while the band recruited new drummer Ferenc Debreczeni. The resulting lineup of Kóbor (vocals), Benkő (keyboards/vocals), Molnár (guitar), Mihály (bass/vocals), and Debreczeni (drums) remained intact for more than 40 years until Mihály retired from touring in 2014. Presser's jazz- and folk-oriented keyboards and songwriting had been dominant in Omega's sound; after his departure the band moved toward progressive rock and space rock with Benkő's classically-oriented keyboards and Molnár's heavy guitar as the focus.

This incarnation of Omega released ten more albums starting in 1972 until taking an extended break in 1987. Most of those albums were released in both Hungarian and English versions. During the 1970s in particular, some of the band's albums were restricted or banned in Hungary due to the Communist regime's view that hard rock music was subversive. However, they were able to tour in East Germany and recorded some songs in German for their fans in that country. During this period they were also noted for science fiction-oriented lyrics. After their thirteenth album Babylon in 1987, Omega went on hiatus so the members could focus on side projects.

Omega regrouped in 1994 for a major concert at Népstadion in Budapest, with special appearances by former members Gábor Presser and Tamás Somló, plus Rudolf Schenker and Klaus Meine of the Scorpions. Following the collapse of Communism in Hungary, most of Omega's previously suppressed albums were released on CD and generated great interest in the band as it returned to performing in 1994. Their first new album after reuniting was Trans and Dance in 1995.

In later years, the nation of Hungary bestowed many awards on the band for their important contributions to the country's music and culture, including the Liszt Ferenc Prize in 1986, the Hungarian National Award in 1998, and the Kossuth Prize in 2013. For their 50th anniversary in 2012, Omega toured with a symphony under the name "Omega Rhapsody". Longtime bassist Tamás Mihály, who had been with the band since 1967, retired from live performances in 2014, though his departure was not officially announced until 2017. The band continued to tour regularly with a rotating cast of sidemen, and the album 55 - Volt Egyszer Egy Vadkelet was released in 2017.

Founding keyboardist/singer László Benkő died at age 77 on 18 November 2020; he had been with Omega consistently since 1962. Just three days later, on 21 November 2020, longtime bassist Tamás Mihály died at age 73. The album Testamentum was released less than a week later, though its release date had been scheduled long in advance. The album has been described as a "farewell" record and contains contributions from both Benkő and Mihály.

Founding singer János Kóbor died at age 78 on 6 December 2021 after contracting COVID-19. The band's manager has indicated that the remaining members will not perform under the Omega name in the future but tribute concerts in different formations may occur. As a finale to the band's 60-year history and in memory of the deceased band members, the remaining musicians together with friends performed as "Omega Testamentum Orchestra" at a three-day festival in Őriszentpéter from August 12 to 14, 2022.

Personnel

Members

Last lineup
Ferenc Debreczeni – drums, percussion (1971–1987, 1994–2021)
László Benkő – keyboards, flute, trumpet, lead & backing vocals (1962–1987, 1994–2020; died in 2020)
János Kóbor – lead & backing vocals (1962–1987, 1994–2021; died in 2021)
Tamás Mihály – bass, cello, lead & backing vocals (1967–1987, 1994–2017; died in 2020)
György Molnár – guitars (1967–1987, 1994–2021)

Last touring musicians
Tamás Szekeres – guitars (1994–2007, 2011–2021)
Katy Zee (Kata Szöllösy) – bass (2011–2021)
Albert Földi – keyboards (2011–2021)
Levente Csordás – vocals (2016–2021)
Mónika Bárkányi – vocals (2019–2021)

Former touring musicians
Vivien Minya – vocals, violin (2016–2019)
Miklós Küronya – bass (1998–2013, in the studio; died in 2015)
Zsolt Gömöry – keyboards (1999–2005, 2012–2015)
Béla Jankai – keyboards (2006–2013)
Ildikó Keresztes – vocals (1999–2007)
György Demeter – vocals, acoustic guitar, trumpet, rattle (1999–2007)
Tamás Demeter – vocals, acoustic guitar, trumpet, rattle (1999–2007, deputy for Ildikó Keresztes and György Demeter)

Former members
Győző Bánkúti – trombone (1962)
Tamás Künsztler – drums, percussion (1962–1964)
Péter Láng – saxophone (1962–1963)
Ferenc Tornóczky Sr. – guitars (1962, died in 2020)
István Varsányi – bass (1962–1967)
András Kovacsics – guitars (1962–1967)
László Harmat – saxophone (1963–1964)
József Laux – drums, percussion (1964–1971; died in 2016)
Gábor Presser – keyboards, lead & backing vocals (1967–1971)
Tamás Somló – saxophone (1964–1968; died in 2016)
Mária Wittek – lead & backing vocals (1964–1967)

Lineups

Timeline

Discography

Studio albums
Hungarian language albums
Trombitás Frédi és a rettenetes emberek (1968), known as Red Star from Hungary in the international market
10000 lépés (1969)
Éjszakai országút (1970)
200 évvel az utolsó háború után (recorded in 1972, but not released until 1998 due to government censorship; Élő Omega, a fake "live" recording of the original studio material was released instead)
Omega 5 (1973) later remixed, remastered and released as Szvit
Omega 6: Nem tudom a neved (1975); later remixed, remastered and released as Tűzvihar - Stormy Fire
Omega 7: Időrabló (1977);
Omega 8: Csillagok útján (1978); later remixed, remastered and with its English-language version released as Csillagok útján - Skyrover
Gammapolis (1979); later remixed, remastered and with its English-language version released as Gammapolisz - Gammapolis
Omega X: Az arc (1981)
Omega XI (1982)
Omega 12: A föld árnyékos oldalán (1986)
Omega XIII: Babylon (1987)
Trans And Dance (1995); later remixed, remastered and released as Transcendent - Hungarian version
Omega XV: Egy életre szól (1998)
Omega XVI: Égi jel: Omega (2006), Mahasz: Gold
Omega Rhapsody (2010)
Omega Szimfónia & Rapszódia (2012), Mahasz: Gold
55 - Volt Egyszer Egy Vadkelet (2017)
Testamentum (2020), Mahasz: 5× Platinum

English language albums
Omega Red Star From Hungary  (1968) extremely rare vinyl recording, since October 2007 available on CD. Vocals by Mihály Tamás
Omega (1973)
200 Years After The Last War (1974)
Omega III (1974)
The Hall Of Floaters In The Sky (1975)
Time Robber (1976)
Skyrover (1978)
Gammapolis (1979)
Working (1981)
Transcendent (1996)
Omega Rhapsody (2010)

Also, one German studio album was released: 
Das Deutsche Album (1973, Amiga Records)

Live albums
Élő Omega (1972, released instead of their 4th studio album, first LP with Debreczeni on drums; on official band's site is included on the Studio Albums list)
Élő Omega Kisstadion 79 (1979; a 2-LP set)
Live At The Kisstadion 79 (1979; a 2-LP set, including some tracks dubbed with English vocals)
Kisstadion '80 (1981; 5 titles by Omega, and rest of the album by 2 other performers of joint show, Locomotiv GT and Beatrice)
Jubileumi Koncert (1983)
Népstadion 1994 Omegakoncert No. 1: Vizesblokk (1994)
Népstadion 1994 Omegakoncert No. 2: Szárazblokk (1994)
Az Omega összes koncertfelvétele 1. (1995, a 3-CD set of live recordings from the 1960s and 1970s, including the Kisstadion 1979 concert)
Az Omega összes koncertfelvétele 2. (1995, a 3-CD set of live recordings from the 1980s and 1990s)
Népstadion 1999 (1999, released as a 2-CD set and as a DVD)
Napot hoztam, csillagot (2004 limited edition CD; a DVD of this title was also released, with a different track list)
Greatest Performances (2012 edition on CD and DVD), Mahasz: Gold

Compilation albums
The Beaty Sixties (Trimedio Music, 2015)
The Spacey Seventies (Trimedio Music, 2015)
The Progressive Eighties (Trimedio Music, 2015)
The Heavy Nineties (Trimedio Music, 2015)
LP Anthology (Hungaroton, 2016, a 13-CD set of all the Hungarian language albums 1968–1987)

See also
Music of Hungary
Hungarian rock

References

External links

Official website (in Hungarian; archived)
Contemporary review of the Gammapolis album in the Budapest Daily News
 

Hungarian progressive rock groups
Musical groups established in 1962
Musical groups disestablished in 2021
Psychedelic rock music groups
Musical quintets
1962 establishments in Hungary
2021 disestablishments in Hungary